Samuel Bellamy Beach (ca. 1780 – July 31, 1866) was an American author.

He graduated from Yale College in 1805.  He came to college from Whitestown, New York, and pursued the profession of the law. In 1824, he published, at Utica, New York, a poem of 109 pages, 12mo., entitled Escalala, an American Tale.

In 1837, after the election of Martin Van Buren to the US Presidency, he was appointed to a clerkship in the Post Office Department at Washington, in which department he remained for most of the time until after President Abraham Lincoln's election.

He was long a resident of Oneonta, New York and identified with many public improvements there. He was the original projector of the Albany and Susquehanna Railroad.

He died in Oneonta, in the 86th year of his age, having been confined to his house for more than a year previous.  His widow, Martha M. Beach, died in June 1867.  Several children survived them.

References

Yale College alumni
Poets from New York (state)
People from Whitestown, New York
1866 deaths
Year of birth uncertain